Independence is a 1976 docudrama film directed by John Huston and starring Eli Wallach, Pat Hingle, and Anne Jackson. E.G. Marshall narrates.

Independence was produced for the U.S. National Park Service on the occasion of the Bicentennial of the United States in 1976. In less than 30 minutes, visitors to Independence National Historical Park would get a quick and dramatic overview of the political events that took place in Philadelphia between 1774 and 1800. As of 2022, the film is no longer shown at Independence National Historical Park's visitor center.

Synopsis
The movie features Franklin, Washington, Jefferson, and others coming back to life and reliving the historic events which took place in Philadelphia at the nation's founding. These include the signing of the Declaration of Independence (1776), the Constitutional Convention (1787), and the inauguration of President John Adams (1797).

Cast
 William Atherton as Benjamin Rush
 Pat Hingle as John Adams
 Anne Jackson as Abigail Adams
 Patrick O'Neal as George Washington
 Ken Howard as Thomas Jefferson (reprising his role from 1776)
 John Randolph as Samuel Adams
 Paul Sparer as John Hancock
 Tom Spratley as George Mason
 James Tolkan as Tom Paine
 Eli Wallach as Benjamin Franklin
 E.G. Marshall as the narrator

See also
 Founding Fathers of the United States
 List of films about the American Revolution
 List of television series and miniseries about the American Revolution

References

External links
 
 

1976 films
1970s English-language films
Films directed by John Huston
American documentary films
1976 documentary films
Independence National Historical Park
1976 drama films
United States Bicentennial
1970s American films